Bas may refer to:

People
 Bas (name), a given name and a surname
 Bas (rapper) (born 1987)

Chemistry 
 Boron arsenide (BAs), a chemical compound
 Barium sulfide (BaS), a chemical compound

Other uses
 bas (French for "low"), as in bas-relief sculpture
 Tamburica, a stringed instrument sometimes known as bas
 BAS (accounting), the Swedish accounting principles and chart of accounts

See also
 
 BAS (disambiguation)
 Bass (disambiguation)